Trnovačko Lake is a lake in northern Montenegro, best known for its heart-like shape. Located at an altitude of 1517 metres, it is popular with local summer campers. The lake is drained from the Maglić, the Volujak and the Bioč mountain ranges. The north side of the lake which is open has the wooded Vratnice. The lake water has a deep green-blue colour.

References

Lakes of Montenegro
Plužine Municipality